The Chip Hilton Player of the Year Award was presented to a men's college basketball player who was a senior and who had demonstrated strong personal character both on and off the court, similar to the fictional Chip Hilton character depicted by Hall of Fame coach Clair Bee in the classic Chip Hilton series of sports stories.

The NCAA had given the national award since 1997 to a Division I player who demonstrated outstanding character, leadership, integrity, humility, sportsmanship and talent. The award was discontinued after the 2010–11 season.

Winners

Footnotes
 Okafor graduated as a finance major in only three years. He was a senior academically in 2003–04, but was still considered a junior as it related to his athletic eligibility.

Awards established in 1997
Awards disestablished in 2011
College basketball trophies and awards in the United States
1997 establishments in the United States
2011 disestablishments in the United States